G. Kothapalli is a village in Prakasam district of the Indian state of Andhra Pradesh. It is located in Racherla mandal. The "G" in the name of village of stands for neighbouring village Gudimetta.

References 

Villages in Prakasam district